The 1864 West Virginia gubernatorial election took place on October 27, 1864, to elect the governor of West Virginia.

Results

References

1864
gubernatorial
West Virginia
October 1864 events
Single-candidate elections